Todd Robinson is an American film director, screenwriter, and producer.

Early life and education
Robinson was born in Media Pennsylvania. He attended Penncrest High School and graduated from Adelphi University on Long Island, New York with a BFA in theatre. His college roommate was the late composer and playwright Jonathan Larson.

Career
In 1996, Robinson wrote and co-produced White Squall, for director Ridley Scott, starring Jeff Bridges, Ryan Phillippe, Jeremy Sisto, and Scott Wolf. Robinson wrote, directed, and produced The Legend of Billy the Kid for The Disney Channel, for which he won a Prime Time Emmy Award.  
He wrote and directed Wild Bill: Hollywood Maverick, a feature documentary on legendary studio director, William A. Wellman. The film was awarded Best Documentary Film by the National Board of Review and was featured at the Sundance Film Festival, the Berlin Film Festival, San Sebastian Film Festival and many other festivals.  His documentary "Amargosa" was the recipient of several Emmy award nominations, receiving one for "Best Cinematography."

In 2006 Robinson wrote and directed Lonely Hearts which starred Jared Leto, Salma Hayek, John Travolta, James Gandolfini, and Laura Dern. In 2009 he directed the feature documentary Amy Cook: The Spaces in Between (released by The Documentary Channel).

Robinson wrote and directed the submarine thriller Phantom from RCR Media Group, Trilogy Entertainment Group and Solar Filmworks.  Phantom stars Ed Harris, David Duchovny, William Fichtner and Jason Beghe.

In 2020 Robinson wrote and directed The Last Full Measure, from Roadside Attractions and Foresight LTD. The film was released in January 2020 and tells the true-life story of Pararescueman William Hart Pitsenbarger and the effort to recognize his valor with a posthumous Medal of Honor. The film stars Sebastian Stan, Christopher Plummer, Samuel L. Jackson, William Hurt, Ed Harris, Peter Fonda, John Savage, and Jeremy Irvine.  The film represents the last screen performances for Peter Fonda and Christopher Plummer.   Robinson has served as a writer and producer on many television programs, most recently Dick Wolf's Chicago PD.

Other ventures
Robinson is an adjunct professor at the USC School of Cinematic Arts. He sits on the board of directors of Save A Warrior, a program that equips returning veterans, active duty service members, and first responders with a community of support and techniques to overcome symptoms associated with Post-Traumatic Stress and suicidal ideations.

Personal life
Robinson is married to entertainment manager, Elizabeth Robinson.  They have two children.

Credits
 Angel Fire (1992) – also director.
 The Legend of Billy the Kid (1994) – also director.
 The Four Diamonds (1995)
 Wild Bill: Hollywood Maverick (1995) – also director.
 White Squall (1996) – also Co-Producer.
 Amargosa (documentary) (2000) – also director and producer.
 Go Tigers! (documentary) (2001) – executive producer.
 Lonely Hearts (2006) – also director.
 Amy Cook: The Spaces in Between (2009) – director and producer.
 Phantom (2013) – also director and executive producer.
 The Last Full Measure (2020) – also director and producer.

References

External links
 

Living people
Year of birth missing (living people)
Adelphi University alumni
American male screenwriters
Action film directors
American film producers
Film directors from Pennsylvania
Screenwriters from Pennsylvania